Stephen Charles Cross (born 22 December 1959) is a former professional footballer from Wolverhampton.

Cross began his career at Shrewsbury Town, following a written request for a trial. 
He made 262 appearances, scoring 33 goals for the club. After leaving Shrewsbury he played for Derby County and Bristol Rovers. Following the departure of Malcolm Allison as Bristol Rovers manager, Cross was appointed caretaker manager for three games, until the appointment of John Ward. Following this, Cross dropped down to play in non-league football for Mangotsfield United and Bath City.

Post retirement
After retiring from Football, Cross briefly worked for the Royal Mail before he went on to develop a career in media, and after several guest appearances as co-commentator on BBC Radio Shropshire for Shrewsbury Town games, Cross took on the role for every game, entertaining listeners with his over-exuberant style of co-commentary.

References

External links
Steve Cross's new Shrews diary

Further reading

1959 births
Living people
Footballers from Wolverhampton
English footballers
English football managers
Shrewsbury Town F.C. players
Derby County F.C. players
Bristol Rovers F.C. players
Mangotsfield United F.C. players
Bath City F.C. players
Bristol Rovers F.C. managers
Association football defenders
Association football midfielders